Flemming Gomme Graae is an American psychiatrist and academician noted for his work on obsessive–compulsive disorder. He served as the Chief of Child Psychiatry at Westchester Medical Center and New York Medical College.

Early life
Graae was born in Copenhagen, Denmark on December 1, 1948 and immigrated to the United States in 1952. He graduated from Kent School in 1967 and received a bachelor's degree from Rutgers University in 1971, a master's degree at Indiana University in 1973, and a M.D. from St. George's University in 1983.

References

1948 births
Living people
American psychiatrists
Indiana University alumni
Kent School alumni
People from Copenhagen
Rutgers University alumni